The International Singing Competition of Toulouse is an international classical singing competition run by the Théâtre du Capitole in Toulouse, France.

History 
First edition took place in 1954. Held annually from 1954 to 1994 (except in 1973), the competition was not held in 1995 due to theatre  renovation work. When it resumed in 1996, the competition became biannual. The Competition has been a member of the World Federation of International Music Competitions since 1958.

In the 1970s and 1980s, the competition was marked by the large number of winners from the USSR, the United States and Romania. Since the mid-2000s, South Korea has been the winner, with 4 consecutive tenors having won the Grand Prix from 2008 to 2016.

Organization

Jury 
The jury is made up of artistic directors of major theaters and opera houses, mainly in Europe, with the notable participation of the Metropolitan Opera of New York (on 12 occasions). During the various editions, it has notably been chaired by Emmanuel Bondeville, Daniel-Lesur, Marcel Landowski, Raymond Gallois-Montbrun, Rolf Liebermann and Hugues Gall. Several foreign celebrities were also jurors, including tenors Ferruccio Tagliavini and Giuseppe Di Stefano, or even sopranos Rita Streich, Birgit Nilsson, Leyla Gencer, Teresa Stich-Randall or Edda Moser.

Participants 
The competition is open to young singers of all nationalities from 18 to 33 years. Applicants must present a program comprising six titles in the Mélodie, Lied, Oratorio categories, and six extracts from operas, with at least one French composer.

See also 
 List of classical music competitions

References 

Classical music awards
Music competitions in France
French awards
Recurring events established in 1954
1954 establishments in France